Bioregional is an entrepreneurial charity, which aims to invent and deliver practical solutions for sustainability. It was founded in 1992 on the belief that overconsumption of resources was the driving force behind environmental degradation, and set out to find new ways to meet more of their needs from local resources.

History 

Bioregional was founded in 1992 by Sue Riddlestone OBE and Pooran Desai OBE, and began operations in the Sutton Ecology Centre. They first worked on local environmental projects, including the promotion of closed loop recycling in London and Surrey, reviving lavender production in Mitcham and Carshalton, setting up Croydon's TreeStation to turn waste municipal wood into biomass, and establishing the Bioregional Charcoal Company Ltd who help a network of local charcoal producers sell to major retail stores. These projects reflected Bioregional's aim of setting up social enterprises that could make the use of local and waste resources mainstream.

Bioregional began to expand in the late 1990s, and with the completion of BedZED they moved into their present offices in Hackbridge, London Borough of Sutton. Using the learnings from BedZED they developed the One Planet Living programme with WWF, which is the framework for all sustainable communities projects and has an equal influence over their vision as the original bioregionalism focus. Currently a One Planet Living communities is being built in Brighton.

Bioregional currently has around 40 staff in London, as well as regional offices in China, Canada, South Africa, Kenya, Greece, Mexico, and Australia.

Founded in 2005, Bioregional North America is an affiliated Canadian non-profit organization that specializes in fostering sustainable behavior change and collaborative consumption amongst occupants in new and existing buildings across the United States and Canada.

Major current projects 

 One Planet Living communities, planned to be built in every continent by 2012 to demonstrate Bioregional's vision.
 B&Q One Planet Home, developing a Sustainability Action Plan for the retailer and a customer-focused campaign and product range
 The Laundry, a closed loop recycling social enterprise for small businesses in central London
 One Planet Products, a sustainable construction materials buying club
 HomeGrown Charcoal, producing charcoal through a decentralized network of charcoal burners reducing transport CO2 by 90%
 Bioregional MiniMills, developing technology to make paper pulp from straw and recovering energy from the effluents
 The EcoConcierge Program by BioRegional North America makes healthier, low-carbon lifestyles convenient for building occupants through hands-on services, building social capital, sustainable design,  collaborative consumption, and community-based social marketing

Past projects 

 BedZED, the UK's largest eco-village
 The sustainability strategy for the 2012 Olympics in London
 Reviving local lavender production in Carshalton and Mitcham
 Croydon TreeStation, a solution for sustainable management of urban forestry to produce biomass fuel
 Local Paper for London, Local Paper for Surrey, promoting closed loop recycling to businesses in these regions

Awards 

 See also awards won for the BedZED project
 2011 - Bioregional's founders Sue Riddlestone OBE and Pooran Desai OBE were named Social Entrepreneurs of the Year at the Davos World Economic Forum by the Schwab Foundation for Social Entrepreneurship
 2009 - Bioregional's founders Sue Riddlestone OBE and Pooran Desai OBE won the Skoll Social Entrepreneur Award.
 June 2007 - Observer ethical awards for Bioregional MiniMills, Invention of the year.
 May 2006 - Ashden Award for Sustainable Energy for Croydon TreeStation

References

External links 
 Bioregional homepage

Environmental organisations based in the United Kingdom
Charities based in London
Sustainability advocates
Low-energy building in the United Kingdom
Organizations established in 1992